downhere is the first official album release under a major record label by Christian rock band downhere. It is only preceded by their 1st (and now out of print) independent album release. The album received the 2002 Covenant Award for Rock Album of the Year and the 2002 Juno Award for Best Gospel Album. The song "Larger Than Life" received the 2002 Covenant Award for Rock Song of the Year and "Protest to Praise" was featured on the WOW Hits 2002 compilation.

The album consists of new songs written for this debut release with Word Records, plus a selection of songs from the previous independent release that were re-recorded. Current bassist Glenn Lavender only appears on the album for the hidden-track "Rock Stars Need Money". His membership in the band wasn't finalized in enough time (after the departure of first bassist, Tyson Manning) for him to appear on the rest of the album, so Nashville studio musicians were used instead. Glenn Lavender already had an association with the band, as they previously met at a 1999 Word Vision Artist Retreat in Florida, USA.

Track listing
All songs written by Jason Germain and Marc Martel.

 "Larger Than Life" - 4:26
 "Free Me Up" - 4:07
 "Reconcile" - 4:30
 "Raincoat" - 4:14
 "Great Are You" - 5:01
 "Calmer of the Storm" - 5:04
 "Making Me" - 4:19
 "Protest to Praise" - 5:07
 "Breathing In" - 4:10
 "So Blue" - 4:08
 "All The Reasons Why" - 2:54
 "Rock Stars Need Money" (hidden track) - 5:32

Personnel 

Downhere
 Jason Germain – lead and backing vocals, acoustic piano, keyboards, Hammond B3 organ, acoustic guitar
 Marc Martel – lead and backing vocals, acoustic guitar, electric guitar, dobro, harmonica
 Glenn Lavender – bass
 Jeremy Thiessen – drums, percussion

Additional Musicians
 Jeff Roach – keyboards
 Nathan Nockels – accordion, acoustic guitar
 Jerry McPherson – acoustic guitar, electric guitar
 Gary Burnette – guitars
 Mark Hill – bass
 Pat Malone – bass
 Dan Needham – drums, percussion
 Ken Lewis – percussion
 Skip Cleavinger – Uilleann pipes, penny whistle
 Tom Howard – string arrangements

Production
 Nathan Nockels – producer, overdub recording
 Jason Germain – co-producer
 Marc Martel – co-producer
 Judith Volz – executive producer
 Craig A. Mason – A&R
 Todd Robbins – recording
 David Streit – recording assistant
 Tom Laune – mixing
 Paul Angelli – mastering
 Louis LaPrad – art direction, design
 Ben Pearson – photography

Studios
 Recorded at The Bennett House (Franklin, Tennessee) and Bridgeway Studios (Nashville, Tennessee).
 Overdubbed at Watermark Studios (Atlanta, Georgia) and Dark Horse Recording Studio (Franklin, Tennessee).
 Mixed at Bridgeway Studios
 Mastered at Sterling Sound (New York City, New York).

Singles
 "Larger Than Life" (2001)
 "Free Me Up" (2001)
 "Great Are You" (2001)
 "Protest To Praise" (2001)
 "Calmer of the Storm" (2001)

References

2001 albums
Downhere albums
Juno Award for Contemporary Christian/Gospel Album of the Year albums